Nursultan Tursynov (born 30 January 1991) is a Kazakhstani Greco-Roman wrestler. He won the gold medal in the men's 85 kg event at the 2014 Asian Wrestling Championships in Astana, Kazakhstan and the silver medal in this event at the 2015 Asian Wrestling Championships in Doha, Qatar.

He represented Kazakhstan at the 2020 Summer Olympics in Tokyo, Japan. He competed in the 87 kg event.

Career 

He competed in the 84 kg event at the 2013 World Wrestling Championships held in Budapest, Hungary. In 2014, he lost his bronze medal match in the 85 kg event at the Asian Games held in Incheon, South Korea.

In 2015, he was eliminated in his third match in the 85 kg event at the World Wrestling Championships held in Las Vegas, United States.

He competed in the 87kg event at the 2022 World Wrestling Championships held in Belgrade, Serbia.

Achievements

References

External links 

 

Living people
1991 births
Place of birth missing (living people)
Kazakhstani male sport wrestlers
Wrestlers at the 2014 Asian Games
Asian Games competitors for Kazakhstan
Wrestlers at the 2020 Summer Olympics
Asian Wrestling Championships medalists
Olympic wrestlers of Kazakhstan
21st-century Kazakhstani people